Gekko kabkaebin, the Lao parachute gecko, is a species of gecko. It is found in Laos.

References 

Gekko
Reptiles described in 2019